"Broken Arrow" is a song written by Canadian singer-songwriter Neil Young and recorded by Buffalo Springfield on their 1967 album Buffalo Springfield Again. It was recorded in August and September 1967 at Columbia Recording Studios and Sunset Sound Recorders. It incorporates musical ideas from "Down Down Down," a demo Young recorded with Buffalo Springfield (now available on the box set).

"Broken Arrow" was confessional folk rock. It consists of three parts in three different time signatures interspersed with snippets of sounds, featuring organ, a jazz combo with piano, bass, drums, and a clarinet. The song begins with audience applause (taken not from a Buffalo Springfield show, as some expect, but rather from a concert by the Beatles) and the opening of "Mr. Soul" (which opens the album) recorded in the studio. The second verse begins with the sound of an audience booing, while the Calliope plays a version of the song "Take Me Out to the Ball Game", before sound effects bring on the verse. There is also the sound of a military snare drum that plays drum rolls, first quietly, and getting louder and louder, until the fifth time, an unusual sound effect brings the song to the third verse. The Jazz combo plays an improvisation, first taken up by the clarinet, and followed by the piano, until it fades out. The beating of a heart is then heard until it fades out as well.

Each of the three verses uses surreal imagery to deal with emotions (emptiness of fame, teenage angst, hopelessness), and contains self-references to Buffalo Springfield and Young. They all end with the same lines:

An acoustic solo version of the song appears on the Neil Young live album Sugar Mountain: Live at Canterbury House 1968 which was released on Reprise Records in 2008.

Of the members of the band, only Young was present at the recording. Background vocals from Richie Furay were added on later.

Historical references
The Creek Indians held a ceremony after the Civil War that included a breaking of an arrow to symbolize the war's end.

References

External links
[ Allmusic Review]

1967 songs
Buffalo Springfield songs
Neil Young songs
Songs written by Neil Young
Songs about Native Americans
Song recordings produced by Jack Nitzsche
Song recordings produced by Neil Young
Song recordings produced by Stephen Stills